Magnus Grønneberg (born April 24, 1967) is the vocalist in the Norwegian rock band CC Cowboys. He has also developed his solo singing career.

Discography
(For his discography in CC Cowboys, see that page)

Solo albums
2001: Wildenwey (WEA) - Tunes for 11 poems by Herman Wildenvey
Track list
 "Spill"
 "Kvinner og atter kvinner" 
 "Myrth"
 "Alle veier bort fra deg" 
 "Selma"
 "Glemt dikt" 
 "Hele dagen"
 "Kiss"
 "Ringen" 
 "De ensomme ting" 
 "Møte"

2002: Helt grønn
Track list
 "Helt grønn"
 "Fly avsted"
 "Morgenhymne" 
 "Galgen"
 "Det er sånn vi skal ha det"
 "Støv"
 "La la la" 
 "Truckdriver'n under" 
 "Gi meg en sjans" 
 "Selskapssyk"
 "En annen by"

Solo singles
1995: "Drømmeskogen" (PolyGram) on album Lekekameratene – Kom ut og lek!, CD against child labor. The project was sponsored by Lo - Norwegian Confederation of Trade Unions
2000: "Der hvor roser aldri dør" track in Perleporten, a charity album for Frelsesarmeen (The Norwegian Salvation Army)

Awards
2007: Herman Wildenvey Poetry Award
2009: Kong Fredriks Hederspris
2010: NOPAs tekstpris

References 

1967 births
Living people
Norwegian rock musicians